These are the results of the Wrestling at the 2021 Islamic Solidarity Games which took place between 10 and 13 August 2022 in Konya, Turkey.

Men's freestyle

57 kg
10 August

61 kg
11 August

65 kg
10 August

70 kg
11 August

74 kg
10 August

79 kg
11 August

86 kg
10 August

92 kg
11 August

97 kg
10 August

125 kg
11 August

Men's Greco-Roman

55 kg
12 August

60 kg
13 August

63 kg
12 August

67 kg
13 August

72 kg
12 August

77 kg
13 August

82 kg
12 August

87 kg
13 August

97 kg
12 August

130 kg
13 August

Women's freestyle

50 kg
10 August

53 kg
11 August

55 kg
12 August

57 kg
13 August

59 kg
10 August

62 kg
11 August

65 kg
12 August

68 kg
13 August

72 kg
11 August

76 kg
12 August

References

2021 Islamic Solidarity Games